A61 or A-61 may refer to:
 A61 road (England), a road connecting Derby and Thirsk
 A61 motorway (France), a road connecting Narbonne and Bordeaux
 A61 motorway (Germany), a road connecting Venlo and Hockenheim
 Benoni Defense, in the Encyclopaedia of Chess Openings